Red Pop or red cream soda is a variant of cream soda that is traditionally flavored with strawberries.

Description
Major producers of Red Pop include Faygo/Shasta and Big Red. The brands do differ to some extent as to the character of their Red Pop. The Faygo Red Pop focuses more on the strawberry flavor, whereas Big Red's Red Pop includes a blend of several fruit flavors, including apple, cherry, and strawberry, with a focus on the cream soda aspect of the drink. Many people refer to the flavor as Red. The original was Faygo Pop Company.

History
Faygo introduced strawberry pop in its 1907 initial line up. In the 1960s, the name of the strawberry pop was officially changed to Red Pop. This is Faygo's top seller.

References

External links
 Big Red Ltd
 Faygo Inc.

Soft drinks